Carles Canut i Bartra (23 September 1944 – 27 September 2018) was a Spanish actor.

He acted in film, television and theater.

Filmography
Negro Buenos Aires (2010)
Don Jaume, el conquistador (1994)
Makinavaja, el último choriso (1992)
El aire de un crimen (1988)
La ràdio folla (1986)
The Knight of the Dragon (1985)
Sagrado y obsceno (1975)

References

1944 births
2018 deaths
Male film actors from Catalonia
Male television actors from Catalonia
Male stage actors from Catalonia